Rhodolaena coriacea is a tree in the family Sarcolaenaceae. It is endemic to Madagascar. The specific epithet  is from the Latin meaning "leathery", referring to the leaves.

Description
The inflorescences have one or two flowers on a long peduncle. The fruits are medium-sized and woody, with a fleshy involucre. The involucre is reportedly eaten by lemurs, facilitating seed dispersal.

Distribution and habitat
Rhodolaena coriacea is only found in the eastern regions of Sava, Vatovavy-Fitovinany, Alaotra-Mangoro and Analanjirofo. Its habitat is coastal and evergreen forests from  altitude.

Threats
Rhodolaena coriacea is threatened by timber exploitation and threats to the lemur population. Future population decline of the tree due to habitat loss is predicted at 50% to 80%, though some subpopulations are considered secure in protected areas. Threats to lemurs would in turn affect the tree's reproduction due to their role in seed dispersal.

The timber is used in construction. Deforestation is a threat to this and other tree species. Due to shifting patterns of agriculture, deforestation is extensive outside of protected areas.

References

coriacea
Endemic flora of Madagascar
Trees of Madagascar
Plants described in 2000